Sessions at West 54th is an American television program that featured music performances, and was in some ways a pop music variation on the theme set by the long-lived Austin City Limits, though the featured musicians represented a number of musical genres.  It was called Sessions at West 54th because it was taped at Sony Music Studios on West 54th Street in Manhattan. Jeb Brien and Niki Vettel, APS senior v.p. for program development, developed the series after working on APS concert specials with Suzanne Vega and Ottmar Liebert.  It was produced for public television syndicator American Program Service (APS) (now American Public Television, Boston) and was carried on many public television stations.  It first aired in most places on July 5, 1997, when it was included in the Saturday late-night lineup of stations covering 85% of the country.  After the program ended, an edited for commercial television version also aired on the commercial Trio cable television network.

It was first hosted by radio disc jockey Chris Douridas of KCRW in Santa Monica, California, while former Talking Heads frontman David Byrne took over hosting duties during the second season and John Hiatt was the host during the third, and final, season.

Episode list

Season 1 (1997)

Season 2 (1998)

Season 3 (1999–2000)

Releases

CD Releases

DVD Releases

VHS Releases

References

Steve Behrens (June 23, 1997). With public TV's new Saturday night concerts, younger viewers can 'eavesdrop' on diverse musicians at work. Current.

External links

KET: Sessions at West 54th Episode List
TV.Com: Episode guide:  Sessions at West 54th

1990s American music television series
2000s American music television series
1997 American television series debuts
2001 American television series endings
David Byrne